Albert Brooks (born Albert Lawrence Einstein ; July 22, 1947) is an American actor, comedian, and filmmaker. He received an Academy Award nomination for Best Supporting Actor for 1987's Broadcast News and was widely praised for his performance as a ruthless Jewish mobster in the 2011 action drama film Drive. Brooks has also acted in Taxi Driver (1976), Private Benjamin (1980), Unfaithfully Yours (1984), and My First Mister (2001). He has written, directed, and starred in several comedy films, such as Modern Romance (1981), Lost in America (1985), and Defending Your Life (1991). He is also the author of 2030: The Real Story of What Happens to America (2011).

His voice acting credits include Marlin in Finding Nemo (2003) and Finding Dory (2016), Tiberius in The Secret Life of Pets (2016), and several one-time characters in The Simpsons, including Hank Scorpio in "You Only Move Twice" (1996) and Russ Cargill in The Simpsons Movie (2007).

Early life
Brooks was born Albert Lawrence Einstein on July 22, 1947 into a Jewish show business family in Beverly Hills, California, to Thelma Leeds (née Goodman), an actress, and Harry Einstein, a radio comedian who performed on Eddie Cantor's radio program and was known as "Parkyakarkus". He is the youngest of three sons. His older brothers are the late comedic actor Bob Einstein (1942–2019), better known as a character he created named "Super Dave Osborne", who had a recurring role in Curb Your Enthusiasm; and Clifford Einstein (b. 1939), a partner and longtime chief creative officer at Los Angeles advertising agency Dailey & Associates. His older half-brother was Charles Einstein (1926–2007), a writer for such television programs as Playhouse 90 and Lou Grant. His grandparents emigrated from Austria and Russia. He grew up among show business families in southern California, attending Beverly Hills High School with Richard Dreyfuss and Rob Reiner.

Career

Early career
Brooks attended Carnegie Mellon University in Pittsburgh, but dropped out after one year to focus on his comedy career. By the age of 19, he had changed his professional name to Albert Brooks, joking that "the real Albert Einstein changed his name to sound more intelligent".  He quickly became a regular on variety and talk shows during the late 1960s and early 1970s. Brooks led a new generation of self-reflective baby-boomer comics appearing on NBC's The Tonight Show Starring Johnny Carson. His on-stage persona, that of an egotistical, narcissistic, nervous comic, an ironic showbiz insider who punctured himself before an audience by disassembling his mastery of comedic stagecraft, influenced other '70s post-modern comedians, including Steve Martin, Martin Mull, and Andy Kaufman.

After two successful comedy albums, Comedy Minus One (1973) and the Grammy Award–nominated A Star Is Bought (1975), Brooks left the stand-up circuit to try his hand as a filmmaker. He had already made his first short film, The Famous Comedians School, a satiric short and an early example of the mockumentary subgenre that was aired in 1972 on the PBS show The Great American Dream Machine.

In 1975, Brooks directed six short films for the first season of NBC's Saturday Night Live. In 1976, he appeared in his first mainstream film role, in Martin Scorsese's landmark Taxi Driver; Scorsese allowed Brooks to improvise much of his dialogue. Brooks had landed the role after moving to Los Angeles to enter the film business.

Brooks directed his first feature film, Real Life, in 1979. The film, in which Brooks (playing a version of himself) films a typical suburban family in an effort to win both an Oscar and a Nobel Prize, was a sendup of PBS' An American Family documentary. It has also been viewed as foretelling the future emergence of reality television. Brooks also made a cameo appearance in the film Private Benjamin (1980), starring Goldie Hawn.

1981–1999
Through the 1980s and 1990s, Brooks co-wrote (with long-time collaborator Monica Johnson), directed and starred in a series of well-received comedies, playing variants on his standard neurotic and self-obsessed character. These include 1981's Modern Romance, where Brooks played a film editor desperate to win back his ex-girlfriend (Kathryn Harrold). The film received a limited release and ultimately grossed under $3 million domestically. It was well received by critics, with one reviewer commenting that the film was "not Brooks at his best, but still amusing". His best-received film, Lost in America (1985), featured Brooks and Julie Hagerty as a couple who leave their yuppie lifestyle and drop out of society to live in a motor home as they have always dreamed of doing, meeting disappointment.

Brooks' Defending Your Life (1991) placed his lead character in the afterlife, put on trial to justify his human fears and determine his cosmic fate. Critics responded to the off-beat premise and the chemistry between Brooks and Meryl Streep, as his post-death love interest. His later efforts did not find large audiences, but still retained Brooks' touch as a filmmaker. He garnered positive reviews for Mother (1996), which starred Brooks as a middle-aged writer moving back home to resolve tensions between himself and his mother (Debbie Reynolds). 1999's The Muse featured Brooks as a Hollywood screenwriter who has "lost his edge", using the services of an authentic muse (Sharon Stone) for inspiration. In an interview with Brooks with regards to The Muse, Gavin Smith wrote, "Brooks' distinctive film making style is remarkably discreet and unemphatic; he has a light, deft touch, with a classical precision and economy, shooting and cutting his scenes in smooth, seamless successions of medium shots, with clean, high-key lighting."

Brooks has appeared as a guest voice on The Simpsons seven times during its run (always under the name A. Brooks). He is described as the best guest star in the show's history by IGN, particularly for his role as supervillain Hank Scorpio in the episode "You Only Move Twice".

Brooks also acted in other writers' and directors' films during the 1980s and 1990s. He had a cameo in the opening scene of Twilight Zone: The Movie, playing a driver whose passenger (Dan Aykroyd) has a shocking secret. In James L. Brooks' hit Broadcast News (1987), Albert Brooks was nominated for an Academy Award for Best Supporting Actor for playing an insecure, supremely ethical network TV reporter, who offers the rhetorical question, "Wouldn't this be a great world if insecurity and desperation made us more attractive?" He also won positive notices for his role in 1998's Out of Sight, playing an untrustworthy banker and ex-convict.

2000–present

Brooks received positive reviews for his portrayal of a dying retail store owner who befriends a disillusioned teenager (played by Leelee Sobieski) in My First Mister (2001). Brooks continued his voiceover work in Pixar's Finding Nemo (2003), as the voice of Marlin, one of the film's protagonists.

In 2005, his film Looking for Comedy in the Muslim World was dropped by Sony Pictures due to their desire to change the title. Warner Independent Pictures purchased the film and gave it a limited release in January 2006; the film received mixed reviews and a low box office gross. As with Real Life, Brooks plays a fictionalized "Albert Brooks", a filmmaker ostensibly commissioned by the U.S. government to see what makes the Muslim people laugh, and sending him on a tour of India and Pakistan.

In 2006 he appeared in the documentary film Wanderlust as David Howard from Lost in America. The documentary included many other well-known people. In 2007, he continued his long-term collaboration with The Simpsons by voicing Russ Cargill, the central antagonist of The Simpsons Movie.

He has played Lenny Botwin, Nancy Botwin's estranged father-in-law, on Showtime's television series Weeds. St. Martin's Press published his first novel, 2030: The Real Story of What Happens to America, on May 10, 2011.

In 2011, Brooks co-starred as the vicious gangster Bernie Rose, the main antagonist in the film Drive, alongside Ryan Gosling and Carey Mulligan. His performance received much critical praise and positive reviews, with several critics proclaiming Brooks' performance as one of the film's best aspects. After receiving awards and nominations from several film festivals and critic groups, but not an Academy Award nomination, Brooks responded humorously on Twitter, "And to the Academy: ‘You don't like me. You really don't like me’."

In 2016, Brooks voiced Tiberius, a curmudgeonly red-tailed hawk, in The Secret Life of Pets, and reprised the role of Marlin from Finding Nemo in the 2016 sequel Finding Dory.

Personal life
In 1997, Brooks married artist Kimberly Shlain, daughter of surgeon and writer Leonard Shlain. They have two children, Jacob and Claire.

Works

Films

Comedy albums

Literature

Filmography

Film

Television

Audiobooks

Awards and nominations

References

External links

 
 
 
 Interview: Albert Brooks: Comedy And Dystopia – On Point.
 "The films of Albert Brooks". Hell Is For Hyphenates. January 31, 2014.

1947 births
Living people
20th-century American male actors
21st-century American male actors
ABC Records artists
American male film actors
American male screenwriters
American male television actors
American male voice actors
American people of Austrian-Jewish descent
American people of Russian-Jewish descent
Asylum Records artists
Beverly Hills High School alumni
Carnegie Mellon University College of Fine Arts alumni
Comedy film directors
Film directors from Los Angeles
Jewish American comedians
Jewish American male actors
Jewish American writers
Jewish male comedians
Male actors from Beverly Hills, California
Male actors from Los Angeles
Screenwriters from California